General elections were held in Saint Kitts-Nevis-Anguilla on 6 November 1957. The result was a victory for the Saint Kitts-Nevis-Anguilla Labour Party, which won five of the eight seats.

Results

References

Saint Kitts
Elections in Saint Kitts and Nevis
1957 in Saint Kitts-Nevis-Anguilla
November 1957 events in North America
Saint Kitts
Election and referendum articles with incomplete results